Giuseppe "Benè" Gola (born 28 December 1904, date of death unknown) was an Italian footballer who played as a defender.

References

Italian footballers
Juventus F.C. players
Juventus F.C. managers
Year of death missing
1904 births
Association football defenders
Italian football managers